Associação de Basquete Cearense or simply Basquete Cearense is a Brazilian professional basketball team that is based in Fortaleza, Ceará, Brazil. The club plays in the Brazilian top-tier level Novo Basquete Brasil (NBB). The team was founded in 2012, and since then has played in all editions of the NBB, reaching the playoffs three times.

History
Basquete Cearense was created in 2012, with the support of the government of Ceará, Fortaleza, City Hall, and sponsored by Sky. It was created as a project franchise, conceived by head coach Alberto Bial, who had been one of those responsible for the creation of the Joinville team. The team became the first basketball team from the Northeast Region of Brazil to play in the top-tier level Novo Basquete Brasil (NBB).

Roster

Noted players

 Duda Machado
 Davi Rossetto
 Marcus Toledo

References

External links
Official website 
Latinbasket.com Profile

Basketball teams in Brazil
Novo Basquete Brasil
Basketball teams established in 2012
2012 establishments in Brazil